Sheriyo Thetto is a Malayalam-language film released in 1951 under the production of Mangala Pictures. The film was directed, written and dialogues by Thikkurissy. The movie was directorial debut of Thikkurissy. Though the movie was not a commercial success it was noted for its camera and editing. It is also the debut film of Adoor Bhavani, Meena Sulochana, Jose Prakash as actor, and dance director N. Damodaran. The camera work is done by M. R. Ranganathan and the dances were choreographed by Ramunni as well as N. Damodaran.

Plot

The story revolves around Appu (Thikkurissi) and his family. Appu is employed as a lorry driver in his hometown. He has completed his military services.

Soundtracks
There are 14 songs written by Thikkurissi, with music by V. Dakshinamoorthy.

Cast
 Thikkurissy Sukumaran Nair as Appu
 Sebastian Kunjukunju Bhagavathar
 S. P. Pillai
 Miss Kumari
 Sethulakshmi
 Adoor Pankajam
T. R. Omana
 Adoor Bhavani
 Jose Prakash
 Meena Sulochana

Reception
The film was not a box office hit and could not impress the audience which made the movie a commercial failure.

References

External links

 

1950s Malayalam-language films
Films directed by Thikkurissy Sukumaran Nair